Swami Krishnashram (Devanagari: कृष्णाश्रम्) was the seventh guru of the Chitrapur Saraswat Brahmin community. He was the seventh mathadhipati (head of the community or guru), for 24 years from 1839 to 1863.

He was considered the "Patron Saint" of the Shirali and its adjoining villages.

Life 

Krishnāshram was born Paramēshwar Nāgar in the small hamlet of Vitthal in Karnataka. He became the seventh Guru Parampara after Swami Vāmanāshram died on the 9th day of the month of kartik in 1839. 

Krishnāshram was an administrator and a scholar of Sanskrit. Devotees came from different parts of the country to hear his discourses, including some from Dvaita Vaishnava practices.

He added several land assets to the Chitrapur Math.

Shishya Sweekār 
Krishnāshram chose Kālappa Shāntapayya, a smart and intelligent boy from Mangalore, as his successor. On the 15th day of the month of Kārtik in 1857, Krishnāshram ordained him as his shishya and named him Pāndurangāshram. Pāndurangāshram would learn under Krishnāshram for six years.

Death 
Swami Krishnāshram fell ill in 1863 and died on the eighth day of the month of mārghashīrsha after being at the helm of the community for 24 years. Pandurangāshram succeeded him as the next guru of the community. The samādhi (shrine) of Krishnāshram is located at the Chitrapur Math in Shirali between the samādhis of Swami Parijnanashram II and Swami Keshavashram.

Accomplishments

Infrastructural development 
Krishnāshram was keenly interested in establishing temples and mathas and renovating already existing ones. Under his leadership, the Shri Subramanyeshwar Temple at Sirsi and the Shri Anantēshwar Temple at Vitthal were some of the temples that were renovated.

The Umā-Maheshwar Temple at Mulki was constructed after the residents of that panchayat requested Krishnāshram for a temple. Krishnāshram himself installed the Umā-Maheshwar deity in the temple.

Rathōtsav ("Car Festival") 
Under Krishnāshram's auspices, the Chariot or Car Festival known as Rathōtsav was introduced in 1862. In this week-long festival, Lord Bhavānishankara adorns the ratha which hundreds of devotees pull around the village. The mathādhipati (head of the community or guru) sits on the ratha. An integral part of the festival is the pālki utsav (Palanquin festival) where the Lord Bhavānishankara adorns the pālki (palanquin) and travels a different route every day to "visit" his devotees. Devotees offer their prayers and seek blessings from the Lord on these days. The route taken is always marked by glowing lights and crackers.

This festivity is marked by chanting of Vedic mantrās (hymns) along with bhajans (devotional songs). Prasād bhojan is served to the devotees. This food is prepared by volunteers. Any small work done towards the betterment of the festival is considered as seva (selfless service) to Lord Bhavānishankara. The Rathōtsav is the time when the entire community unites to take part in the festivity.

Miracles 

Several miracles have been attributed to Swami Krishnāshram.

Un-earthing Umā-Maheshwar 

Once Krishnāshram had a dream in which the Lord Bhavānishankara guided him to the jungles of Gersappe in Shimōga. There he was shown an idol of Umā-Maheshwar hidden in the deep jungle. Krishnāshram guided his followers to the place as shown in his dream. At exactly the same location as in the dream, an exquisite sculpture of Umā-Maheshwar was unearthed.

This idol was installed near the shrine (samādhi) of Ādi Parijñānāshram Swamiji at the Bhandikeri Math (Ādi Matha) in Gokarn.

Fire at Shirali 

One year during the pāliki utsav in the month of Kārtik at Shirali, the people ignored the festival. They did not light lamps nor offer flowers and ārtis to the Lord. They shunned and turned their backs onto Lord Bhavānishankara.

Krishnāshram wanted the people to believe that whatever they offer to the Lord was not theirs but belonged to the Lord in the first place. Furthermore, the good lives that people enjoyed were because of the grace of the Lord; selfishness and ignorance did not play any role in success. That night a devastating fire swept across Shirali that resulted in wanton destruction. Despite the people's efforts, the fire would not extinguish. The people realized their folly and sought forgiveness at Krishnāshram's feet. As if by divine intervention, the fire was extinguished and further losses were prevented.

References

Notes 

19th-century Hindu religious leaders
1863 deaths
Year of birth unknown